The National Transition Council of Congo (French Conseil national de transition) was a political body in the Republic of the Congo that was involved in the composition of the 1997 General Sassou Nguesso's government, setting up a 75-member body in the place of the parliament.

The National Transitional Council adopted a new Constitution of Congo in May 2001. The new Constitution enabled the government to choose the date of presidential, parliament and local elections.

Stance of UN 
United Nations supported the National Transitional Council of the Republic of Congo.

External links 
 Congo Institutional Situation

References 

History of the Republic of the Congo
Politics of the Republic of the Congo
Political organisations based in the Republic of the Congo